Charles Haddon Spurgeon Chambers (22 April 1860 – 28 March 1921) was an Australia-born dramatist, active in England.

Early life
Chambers was born in Petersham, Sydney, the son of John Ritchie Chambers, who had a good position in the New South Wales civil service, came from Ulster, his mother, Frances, daughter of William Kellett, from Waterford. Charles was educated at the Petersham, Marrickville, and Fort Street High schools, but found routine study tedious and showed no special promise. He entered the lands department at 15 but did not stay long. After two years in the outback working as a boundary rider, in 1880 he was invited by cousins to return with them to Ulster, from there he visited England. On Chambers' return he was in the managerial department of the Montague-Turner opera company.

Career
In 1882 Chambers moved to England; he had no friends there and had to try various occupations in order to make a living. Chambers wrote letters from London for The Bulletin. In 1884 his first story was accepted, and other work appeared in popular magazines of the time like Society and Truth. In 1886 a one-act play, One of Them, was acted in London and another curtain-raiser, The Open Gate, was played at the Comedy Theatre in 1887. His first real success was Captain Swift, which was produced by Beerbohm Tree at the Haymarket Theatre in the autumn of 1888. In the United States Maurice Barrymore played Captain Swift on Broadway. This play had a good run and was played all over England, in America, and in Australia. He had another success with The Idler (1890). His next three plays The Honourable Herbert, The Old Lady, and The Pipes of Peace did not achieve success, but John-O-Dreams, first played in 1894, was successful. Also in 1894, he had some success with The Fatal Card. In 1899 possibly his best play, The Tyranny of Tears, was produced by Charles Wyndham and was frequently revived. Among his later plays Passers By (1911) and The Saving Grace (1917) are possibly the best.

The famous London-based Australian operatic soprano, Dame Nellie Melba, was his mistress for a number of years. The relationship ended in 1904 for reasons which remain unclear.

Late life
Chambers retained his interest in Australia and spoke of returning there but never did so. He died at the Bath Club, London of cerebro-vascular disease on 28 March 1921 and was buried at Kensal Green Cemetery.

He was twice married, and was survived by his second wife, originally Nelly Louise Burton but known professionally as 'Pepita Bobadilla', and a daughter of the first marriage to Mary, née Dewer. His widow married Sidney Reilly, "Ace of Spies", in 1923.

Works

 Captain Swift (play) 1919  filmed in 1920, directed by Tom Terriss and Chester Bennett 
 The Impossible Woman (play) 1916 
 Passers By (film) 1915 (play) 1920
 The Fatal Card (play) 1915
 A Modern Magdalen (play) 1914
 The Idler 1914 
 Tyranny of tears: A comedy in four acts (1902)
 The Awakening

References
B. G. Andrews, 'Chambers, Charles Haddon Spurgeon (1860 - 1921)', Australian Dictionary of Biography, Volume 7, MUP, 1979, p. 603.

External links
 
 

1860 births
1921 deaths
Australian dramatists and playwrights
Australian people of Irish descent